Saheb (also Romanized as Şāḩeb, Sâheb and Sāhib) is a city and capital of Ziviyeh District, in Saqqez County, Kurdistan Province, Iran. At the 2006 census, its population was 1,489, in 344 families. The city is populated by Kurds.

References

Towns and villages in Saqqez County
Cities in Kurdistan Province
Kurdish settlements in Kurdistan Province